A fiddle is a bowed string musical instrument, most often a violin. It is a colloquial term for the violin, used by players in all genres, including classical music. Although in many cases violins and fiddles are essentially synonymous, the style of the music played may determine specific construction differences between fiddles and classical violins. For example, fiddles may optionally be set up with a bridge with a flatter arch to reduce the range of bow-arm motion needed for techniques such as the double shuffle, a form of bariolage involving rapid alternation between pairs of adjacent strings. To produce a "brighter" tone than the deep tones of gut or synthetic core strings, fiddlers often use steel strings. The fiddle is part of many traditional (folk) styles, which are typically aural traditions—taught "by ear" rather than via written music.

Fiddling is the act of playing the fiddle, and fiddlers are musicians that play it. Among musical styles, fiddling tends to produce rhythms that focus on dancing, with associated quick note changes, whereas classical music tends to contain more vibrato and sustained notes. Fiddling is also open to improvisation and embellishment with ornamentation at the player's discretion, in contrast to orchestral performances, which adhere to the composer's notes to reproduce a work faithfully. It is less common for a classically trained violinist to play folk music, but today, many fiddlers (e.g., Alasdair Fraser, Brittany Haas, and Alison Krauss) have classical training.

History
The medieval fiddle emerged in 10th-century Europe, deriving from the Byzantine lira, a bowed string instrument of the Byzantine Empire and ancestor of most European bowed instruments.

The first recorded reference to the bowed lira was in the 9th century by the Persian geographer Ibn Khurradadhbih (d. 911); in his lexicographical discussion of instruments he cited the lira (lūrā) as a typical instrument of the Byzantines and equivalent to the rabāb played in the Islamic Empires.

Lira spread widely westward to Europe; in the 11th and 12th centuries European writers use the terms fiddle and lira interchangeably when referring to bowed instruments.

West African fiddlers have accompanied singing and dancing with one-string gourd fiddles since the twelfth century , and many black musicians in America learned on similar homemade fiddles before switching over to the European violin. As early as the mid-1600s, black fiddlers ("exquisite performers on three-stringed fiddles") were playing for both black and white dancers at street celebrations in the Dutch settlement of New Amsterdam (New York City), and by 1690 slave fiddlers were routinely providing the music at plantation balls in Virginia.

Over the centuries, Europe continued to have two distinct types of fiddles: one, relatively square-shaped, held in the arms, became known as the viola da braccio (arm viol) family and evolved into the violin; the other, with sloping shoulders and held between the knees, was the viola da gamba (leg viol) group. During the Renaissance the gambas were important and elegant instruments; they eventually lost ground to the louder (and originally less aristocratic) viola da braccio  family.

Etymology
The etymology of fiddle is uncertain: it probably derives from the Latin fidula, which is the early word for violin, or it may be natively Germanic.

The name appears to be related to Icelandic Fiðla and also Old English fiðele. A native Germanic ancestor of fiddle might even be the ancestor of the early Romance form of violin.

In medieval times, fiddle also referred to a predecessor of today's violin. Like the violin, it tended to have four strings, but came in a variety of shapes and sizes. Another family of instruments that contributed to the development of the modern fiddle are the viols, which are held between the legs and played vertically, and have fretted fingerboards.

Ensembles

In performance, a solo fiddler, or one or two with a group of other instrumentalists, is the norm, though twin fiddling is represented in some North American, Scandinavian, Scottish and Irish styles. Following the folk revivals of the second half of the 20th century, it became common for less formal situations to find large groups of fiddlers playing together—see for example the Calgary Fiddlers, Swedish Spelmanslag folk-musician clubs, and the worldwide phenomenon of Irish sessions.

Orchestral violins, on the other hand, are commonly grouped in sections, or "chairs". These contrasting traditions may be vestiges of historical performance settings: large concert halls where violins were played required more instruments, before electronic amplification, than did more intimate dance halls and houses that fiddlers played in.

The difference was likely compounded by the different sounds expected of violin music and fiddle music. Historically, the majority of fiddle music was dance music, while violin music had either grown out of dance music or was something else entirely. Violin music came to value a smoothness that fiddling, with its dance-driven clear beat, did not always follow. In situations that required greater volume, a fiddler (as long as they kept the beat) could push their instrument harder than could a violinist. Various fiddle traditions have differing values.

Scottish, with cello
In the very late 20th century, a few artists have successfully attempted a reconstruction of the Scottish tradition of violin and "big fiddle", or cello. Notable recorded examples include Iain Fraser and Christine Hanson, Amelia Kaminski and Christine Hanson's Bonnie Lasses, Alasdair Fraser and Natalie Haas' Fire and Grace., and Tim Macdonald and Jeremy Ward's The Wilds.

Balkan, with kontra
Hungarian, Slovenian, and Romanian fiddle players are often accompanied by a three-stringed variant of the viola—known as the kontra—and by double bass, with cimbalom and clarinet being less standard yet still common additions to a band.  In Hungary, a three-stringed viola variant with a flat bridge, called the kontra or háromhúros brácsa makes up part of a traditional rhythm section in Hungarian folk music.  The flat bridge lets the musician play three-string chords. A three-stringed double bass variant is also used.

Styles
To a greater extent than classical violin playing, fiddle playing is characterized by a huge variety of ethnic or folk music traditions, each of which has its own distinctive sound.

Europe

Great Britain
 English folk music fiddling, including
Northumbrian fiddle style, which features "seconding", an improvised harmony part played by a second fiddler.
Lakeland or Cumbrian fiddling has a repertoire largely based upon hornpipes but also incorporates reels and jigs.
 Scottish fiddling, including:
Shetland fiddling, which includes trowie tunes said to come from peerie folk. The style is characterised by "ringing strings" and syncopated rhythms.
A North East (particularly Aberdeenshire and Moray) tradition strongly influenced by baroque violin technique with staccato and Scotch snap bowing techniques and double stops.
A Scottish Borders tradition with a repertoire heavy in hornpipes and with heavy use of double stops.
A Highland tradition, highly influenced by the ornamentation and mixolydian scale of the Great Highland Bagpipe, as well as smoother bowing than other Scottish fiddle styles and a swinging of the 6/8 jig rhythm.
A West Highland and Hebridean Tradition, very closely related to the Highland tradition with major influence from the Gaelic song tradition.
An Orkney tradition with simpler bowing and ornamentation but with tunes featuring accidentals.
 Welsh fiddling (Welsh Ffidil; see Ar Log), a recently revived tradition.

Ireland
 Irish folk music fiddling including:
Donegal fiddling from the northwest in Ulster, which features mazurkas and a Scottish-influenced repertoire including Strathspey and Highland Fling dances. Fiddlers tend to play fast and make heavy use of staccato bowing and may from time to time "play the bass", meaning a second fiddler may play a melody an octave below where a first fiddler is playing it.
Sligo fiddling from northern Connacht, which like Donegal fiddling tends to be fast, but with a bouncier feel to the bowing.
Galway fiddling southern Connacht, which is slower than Sligo or Donegal traditions, with a heavier emphasis on ornamentation. Tunes are occasionally played in Eb or Bb to match the tonality of flat pipes.
Clare fiddling from northern Munster, which tends to be played near the slower Galway tempo yet with a greater emphasis on the melody itself rather than ornamentation.
Sliabh Luachra fiddling from the southwest in Munster, characterized by a unique repertoire of polkas and slides, the use of double stops and drones, as well as playing the melody in two octaves as in Donegal.

Nordic countries
 Norwegian fiddling (including Hardanger fiddling; see also Bygdedans and Gammaldans), including traditions from:
Røros and Nord-Noreg styles, both using the standard fiddle.
Finnskogen, using the standard fiddle, but featuring some flatted notes influenced by Finnish folk music.
Voss and Telemark styles, both using the Hardanger fiddle.
Setesdal, which uses both standard and Hardanger fiddles.
 Swedish fiddling (including Låtfiol playing; see also Spelmanslag and Gammaldans), including traditions from:
Jämtland
Dalarna
 Finnish fiddling, including the regional styles of:
Kaustinen
Ostrobothnia, heavily influenced by Swedish fiddling.

Continental Europe

 Austrian fiddling
 French fiddling, including an old tradition from Corrèze and a revived one from Brittany
 Hungarian folk music traditions
 Italian fiddling
 Klezmer fiddling
 Polish fiddling
 Mainland Portuguese and Azorean fiddling
 Romanian fiddling

Americas

United States

American fiddling, a broad category including traditional and modern styles

Traditional
Blues fiddling
Cajun and Zydeco fiddling
Native American fiddling, including:
Cherokee
Creek
Tohono O'odham waila music, a style heavily influenced by Mexican fiddling and featuring irregular counts and harmonies in thirds, fourths, and sixths.
Old time fiddling, including:
Fiddling from Appalachia, the most well-known style today, featuring heavy use of droning and double-stops as well as syncopated bowing patterns.
Athabaskan fiddling of the Interior Alaska.
Midwestern fiddling, highly influenced by Scandinavian music.
Ozarks fiddling, faster and crisper bowing than Appalachia.
Texas fiddling, with influences from Mexican fiddling and an emphasis on competitive playing.
New England fiddling, with strong influences from Québécois/French Canadian and British repertoires.
Northwest fiddling, with influences from both Ozark and Midwestern fiddle styles, though with a strong emphasis on competitive playing like Texas fiddling.

Modern
Bluegrass fiddling
Country fiddling
Western swing style fiddling

Canada
Fiddling remains popular in Canada, and the various homegrown styles of Canadian fiddling are seen as an important part of the country's cultural identity, as celebrated during the opening ceremony of the Vancouver 2010 Winter Olympics.
Cape Breton fiddling, with a distinct Scottish influence
French Canadian fiddling including "crooked tunes", that is, tunes with irregular beat patterns.
Métis fiddling, of central and western Canada featuring strong French Canadian influence, but with even more "crooked" tunes.
Newfoundland fiddling
Maritimes, Acadian or Downeast style of fiddling, which has many similarities to Cape Breton fiddling
English Canadian fiddling or Anglo-Canadian fiddling

Mexico

Mexican fiddling includes
Danza indígena
Mariachi
Son arribeño
Son calentano
Son huasteco
Son planeco
Violín-tambora
Violín tuxtleco
Violín mixteco

South America
 Forró, a type of music from Brazil, including the rabeca fiddle tradition
 Peruvian violin

Africa, Asia and Australia
African fiddle
Australian folk music traditions
Huqin Chinese fiddles
Morna fiddling from Cape Verde
Indian fiddle
Indian classical music

Related instruments

Variants

Hardanger fiddle
Stroh violin or phonofiddle, known in Romanian as Vioara cu goarnă.

Near relations
Cello
Double bass
Kontra
 Låtfiol
Rebec
Rabeca
Viola

Distant relations

Apache fiddle
Byzantine lyra, the medieval bowed instrument of the Byzantine Empire
Cretan Lyra
Crwth
Gadulka
Gudok
Gusle
Hurdy-gurdy also known as the wheel fiddle
Kamancheh
Lijerica
Nyckelharpa
Rebab

See also

 Fleadh Cheoil
 List of All-Ireland Champions
 List of fiddlers
 Jazz violin

References

Citations

Sources 
 The Fiddle Book, by Marion Thede, (1970), Oak Publications. .
 The Fiddler's Fakebook, by David Brody, (1983), Oak Publications. US ; UK .
 Oldtime Fiddling Across America, by David Reiner and Peter Anick (1989), Mel Bay Publications. . Has transcriptions (standard notation) and analysis of tunes from multiple regional and ethnic styles.
 The Portland Collection, by Susan Songer, (1997),  (Vol. 2 )
North American Fiddle Music: a research and information guide by Drew Beisswenger (2011) Routledge.

External links

 Faroese fiddling
 The Fiddler's Companion, an encyclopedia of historical notes on tunes from British, Celtic, and American traditions
 Differences between fiddle and violin
 Polish Fiddles - mazanki, złóbcoki
 Złóbcoki (fiddles) - “Instruments with Soul” documentary
 Violoneux.fr, background information on fiddlers of different French regions in the nineteenth and early twentieth century. In French.

Cajun musical instruments
Celtic musical instruments
Czech musical instruments
English musical instruments
American musical instruments
Fiddles
Irish musical instruments
Scottish musical instruments
Welsh musical instruments
Violins